Rodrigo Vera Sánchez (born June 23, 1994, in Agua Dulce, Veracruz), known as Rodrigo Vera, is a Mexican professional association football (soccer) player who plays for C.D. Tepatitlán de Morelos.

External links
 

Liga MX players
Living people
1994 births
Footballers from Veracruz
Mexican footballers
Association footballers not categorized by position
21st-century Mexican people